Samtak is a national trade union centre for the Faroe Islands.

The federation was established in 2006 by Sonja Jógvansdóttir, who remains its co-ordinator.  The federation has four affiliates, with a total of about 5,600 members, and it is affiliated to the Council of Nordic Trade Unions.

The affiliates of Samtak are:

 Faroe Islands Workers' Association
 Faroe Islands Fishers' Association
 Klaksvik Workers' Association
 Klaksvik Working Women's Association

The Torshavn Workers' Association was formerly affiliated to the federation.

External links

References

Trade unions in the Faroe Islands
Faroe Island
Trade unions established in 2006
National federations of trade unions
Organizations based in the Faroe Islands
2006 establishments in the Faroe Islands